This is a list of American television-related events in 1956.

Events

Other notable events
 The Paramount Television Network ends network operations after about eight years.

Television programs

Debuts

Ending this year

Networks and services

Network launches

Network closures

Television stations

Station launches

Network affiliation changes

Station closures

Births

Deaths

References

External links 
 List of 1956 American television series at IMDb